{|

{{Infobox ship career
|Ship country=Australia
|Ship flag=
|Ship namesake=The Parramatta River
|Ship builder=Cockatoo Island Dockyard
|Ship laid down=9 November 1938
|Ship launched=10 June 1939
|Ship commissioned=8 April 1940
|Ship motto=
|Ship nickname=
|Ship honours=*Battle honours:Libya 1941
Plus two inherited honours
|Ship fate=Torpedoed and sunk on 27 November 1941 by 
|Ship notes=
|Ship badge=
}}

|}HMAS Parramatta (U44)''' was a Grimsby class sloop of the Royal Australian Navy (RAN). Built during the late 1930s, Parramatta operated in the Red Sea and Mediterranean during World War II.

ConstructionParramatta was laid down on 9 November 1938 at the Cockatoo Island Dockyard at Sydney, New South Wales. She was launched on 10 June 1939 and commissioned into the Royal Australian Navy (RAN) on 8 April 1940.

Operational historyParramatta was assigned to the Red Sea Force in July 1940, and arrived in Aden at the month's end. The majority of the ship's duties were escorting convoys. The sloop was later transferred to the Mediterranean Fleet.

While in the Mediterranean, Parramatta was one of several warships used to supply and support the Allied forces besieged at Tobruk, nicknamed the Tobruk Ferry Service. While operating off Tobruk on 24 June 1941, Parramatta, the British sloop , and the petrol carrier Pass of Balmaha were attacked by over 70 dive bombers. The Australian warship shot down three aircraft during the engagement without receiving major damage, but Auckland was sunk. Parramatta later helped recover the 164 survivors.

Loss
Only 24 aboard survived, with 138 killed.

The sloop's wartime service was later recognised by the battle honour "Libya 1941".

Notes

References

Further reading

External links

HMAS Parramatta (II) RAN Ship Histories

Grimsby-class sloops of the Royal Australian Navy
World War II shipwrecks in the Mediterranean Sea
1939 ships
Ships sunk by German submarines in World War II
Maritime incidents in November 1941